Campus The Hague is an institution for university education and scientific research apart of Leiden University, located in The Hague. The teaching and research at Campus The Hague focuses on politics, public administration and international law, urban issues, and health.

History 
Campus The Hague was founded in 1998 as a partnership between the university and the municipality of The Hague.

Education
All seven faculties of the university are active in The Hague, and around 20 per cent of the total student body of the university attend this campus. The faculty Governance and Global Affairs (FGGA) is exclusively located in The Hague. 

Campus The Hague offers courses on several areas, including public administration, international law, politics and government.

In 2015 Delft University of Technology opened a branch at Campus The Hague, in the Wijnhaven Building, offering a master's degree in Engineering and Policy Analysis.

In 2016, Leiden University Medical Center founded an additional branch at Campus The Hague, with research, teaching and a training program for GPs.

As part of its facilities, Leiden University Library opened a library at Campus The Hague.

Research
The research branch of Campus The Hague focuses on management, international law and government. It includes many research institutes.

Institute of Security and Global Affairs

The Institute of Security and Global Affairs (ISGA) was created in 2016, when the Centre for Terrorism and Counterterrorism (CTC) and the Centre for Global Affairs were combined. It is one of three research institutes within the Faculty of Governance and Global Affairs (FGGA), and focuses on security. Within this issue, its main themes are terrorism and political violence, cybersecurity, governance of crises, and diplomacy and global affairs. 

IGSA focuses on multidisciplinary research and education within the field of security studies, and describes its approach as glocal, meaning that "the local, national, transnational and global impact are studied and analysed in conjunction with each other".

Other research institutes
 Centre for Innovation
 Centre for Modern Urban Studies (MUS)
 Centre for Professional Learning (CPL)
 Dual PhD Centre
 Grotius Centre for International Legal Studies
 Institute of Public Administration
 Leiden Leadership Centre
 Leiden Risk & Regulation Lab
 Leiden University College The Hague
 Montesquieu Institute, which includes the Parliamentary Documentation Centre (PDC UL)

Buildings of Campus The Hague

References

External links 

 
  
 Leiden University
 Leiden University 

Leiden University
Organisations based in The Hague
1998 establishments in the Netherlands